Q'illu Apachita (Aymara and Quechua q'illu yellow, apachita the place of transit of an important pass in the principal routes of the Andes; name for a stone cairn in the Andes, a little pile of rocks built along the trail in the high mountains, also spelled Khellu Apacheta) is a mountain in the Bolivian Andes which reaches a height of approximately . It is located in the Chuquisaca Department, Nor Cinti Province, San Lucas Municipality. It lies northeast of Llaqta Pampa.

References 

Mountains of Chuquisaca Department